Holy Trinity Lyonsdown is a Church of England parish church in New Barnet, London. The church was built in 1866.

The first incumbent was William Gibbs Barker.

References

External links 

https://holytrinitychurchlyonsdown.weebly.com/

 

Church of England church buildings in the London Borough of Barnet
New Barnet
Buildings and structures completed in 1866
1866 establishments in England
19th-century Church of England church buildings